Weather the Storm is the only studio album by American country music trio Carolina Rain. It was released on September 19, 2006 via Equity Music Group. The album features the singles "I Ain't Scared", "Get Outta My Way", and "Isn't She".

Content
The album's first single, "I Ain't Scared", charted on Hot Country Songs in 2004. Another single, "Let's Get It On", charted in 2005, but did not make the final cut of the album. "Get Outta My Way" and "Isn't She" were both issued in 2006. Clint Black, who owned the Equity Music Group label at the time, produced some of the tracks and provided percussion accompaniment. Other producers on the album included Stephony Smith, Justin Niebank, and the band itself.

Critical reception

Jeff Tamarkin of Allmusic rated the album 3.5 out of 5 stars, praising the prominence of vocal harmony, fiddle, and banjo in the production. Dave Bagdade of Country Standard Time gave the album a positive review, calling the songs "well-constructed" while also noting the prominence of vocal harmony and describing the instrumental arrangements with favor. Cathalena E. Burch of the Arizona Daily Star was also positive toward the band's sound, writing that the album "arrives with a warm and fuzzy feeling of familiarity. But just when you've accepted that this is a band like so many that came before it, Carolina Rain drops in something old that sounds new."

Track listing

Personnel
Adapted from liner notes.
Carolina Rain
Rhean Boyer - lead vocals, acoustic guitar, resonator guitar
Marvin Evatt - low harmony vocals, banjo
Jeremy Baxter - high harmony vocals, mandolin
Additional musicians
Clint Black - percussion (1-4, 11, 12)
Steve Brewster - drums (tracks 1-4, 11, 12)
Mike Brignardello - bass guitar (8)
Chad Cromwell - drums (6)
J. T. Corenflos - electric guitar (all tracks)
Eric Darken - percussion (6, 7, 9, 10)
Dan Dugmore - steel guitar, mandolin (5, 6, 7, 9, 10)
Kevin Grantt - bass guitar (1, 3, 4, 11, 12)
Kenny Greenberg - electric guitar (7, 9, 10)
Anthony Harrell - Hammond B-3 organ (8)
Steve Hinson - steel guitar (8)
Mike Johnson - steel guitar (1-4, 11, 12)
Kevin Key - bass guitar (2)
Chris McHugh - drums (5)
Greg Morrow - drums (tracks 7, 9, 10)
Billy Panda - acoustic guitar (8)
Larry Paxton - bass guitar (5, 6, 7, 9, 10)
Steve Sheehan - acoustic guitar, ganjo, resonator guitar (all tracks except 8)
Steve Turner - drums (8)
Wanda Vick - mandolin (5)

Technical
Clint Black - producer (1-4, 11, 12)
Rhean Boyer - producer (8)
Carolina Rain - producer (1-4, 6, 11, 12)
Ricky Cobble - recording
P. T. Houston - recording
David Leonard - mnixing
Mills Logan - recording, mixing
Ken Love - mastering
Justin Niebank - producer (6), recording
Stephony Smith - producer (5, 7, 9, 10)

Chart performance

References

2006 debut albums
Carolina Rain albums
Equity Music Group albums
Albums produced by Clint Black